Vafa Huseynova (also Vəfa Hüseynova; born 10 November 1988) was an Azerbaijani group rhythmic gymnast. She represented her nation at international competitions.

She participated at the 2008 Summer Olympics in Pakistan.

She also competed at world championships, including at the 2005, 2007 and 2009 World Rhythmic Gymnastics Championships.

References

External links
https://database.fig-gymnastics.com/public/gymnasts/biography/5038/true?backUrl=%2Fpublic%2Fresults%2Fdisplay%2F544%3FidAgeCategory%3D8%26idCategory%3D78%23anchor_41799
https://www.youtube.com/watch?v=KXN0sjjSjWc

1988 births
Living people
Azerbaijani rhythmic gymnasts
Place of birth missing (living people)
Gymnasts at the 2008 Summer Olympics
Olympic gymnasts of Azerbaijan